NCEO may refer to:

National Center for Employee Ownership, American organization promoting employee ownership of businesses
National Centre for Earth Observation, part of the Natural Environment Research Council
National Confederation of Employers' Organisations, former name of the British Employers' Confederation